Saturday Night Jamboree, also referred to as the NBC Jamboree, was an early American country music series on NBC-TV from December 4, 1948–July 2, 1949. The name was originally given to an NBC Saturday night radio show in the 1930s, which was broadcast on the WEAF station in New York City.

The TV series aired live from New York City from 8–9 p.m. Eastern Time on Saturdays for three weeks in December 1948, with yodeler Elton Britt as host.  Beginning in January 1949, the host was Boyd Heath and the program aired from 8–8:30 p.m. until April, when it moved to 9:30–10 p.m. through July 2.     
The cast included  comedian "Chubby Chuck" Roe; Sophrony Garen, vocals; Ted Grunt, fiddle; Eddie Howard, banjo; John Havens, guitar; "Smilin'" Edwin Smith, accordion and Gabe Drake, bass fiddle.

References

External links
 

NBC original programming
Black-and-white American television shows
1940s American variety television series
1948 American television series debuts
1949 American television series endings
American country music
American live television series
Country music television series
English-language television shows